Crepidodera lamina is a species of flea beetles from the Chrysomelidae family that can be found in Benelux, Italy, Spain, Ukraine, Yugoslavian states, Central Europe, and European part of Turkey.

References

Beetles described in 1901
Beetles of Europe
Alticini